Drymonia querna, the oak marbled brown, is a moth of the family Notodontidae. It is found in the Middle East and mainland Europe except the north.

The wingspan is 38–43 mm. The moth flies from May to August depending on the location.

The larvae inhabit warm and dry woodlands and scrub in the lowlands. They feed on oak and also European beech.

References

External links
Fauna Europaea
Lepidoptera of Belgium 
Vlindernet.nl 

Notodontidae
Moths of Europe
Moths of Asia
Moths described in 1775
Taxa named by Michael Denis
Taxa named by Ignaz Schiffermüller